MV Northern Expedition is a roll-on/roll-off (RORO) ferry operated by BC Ferries in British Columbia, Canada. She sails daily on the Inside Passage route connecting Prince Rupert and Port Hardy.

History
On August 18, 2006 BC Ferries awarded the contract to build a replacement vessel for Queen of Prince Rupert to Flensburger Schiffbau-Gesellschaft shipyard in Flensburg, Germany (the same shipyard awarded the contract for the three new  ferries).  Shortly thereafter it was determined that the new ship would be named Northern Expedition and that BC Ferries' other northern vessel (the recently purchased Sonia, the replacement for the sunken Queen of the North) would be named Northern Adventure.

The keel of the vessel was laid on June 16, 2008 and she was launched on September 25, 2008.
Sea trials took place at Baltic Sea east from Danish island Bornholm between January 7–9, 2009. The vessel left Germany on 30 January 2009 bound for B.C. via the Panama Canal.  Northern Expedition completed her 9,900 nautical mile journey on 6 March 2009, passing Victoria and Vancouver before arriving in Departure Bay at Nanaimo for post-voyage inspection.

Northern Expedition entered service on 18 May 2009 along the Inside Passage route between Prince Rupert and Port Hardy.  She joined Northern Adventure in BC Ferries' northern fleet and allowed for the retirement of Queen of Prince Rupert.

Amenities
Northern Expeditions four passenger decks feature:
55 staterooms
the Canoe Cafe
the Vista Restaurant
the reserved seating Aurora Lounge
the Raven Lounge, which features 3 large-screen TV's
the Passages Gift Shop
a children's play area
multiple non-reserved seating lounges

References

External links

 BC Ferries Newbuild Program
 BC Ferries Northern Expedition Updates

Ships of BC Ferries
2008 ships
Ships built in Flensburg